OffSec is an American international company working in information security, penetration testing and digital forensics. Operating from around 2007, the company created open source projects, advanced security courses, the ExploitDB vulnerability database, and the Kali Linux distribution. The company was started by Mati Aharoni, and employs security professionals with experience in security penetration testing and system security evaluation. The company has provided security counseling and training to many technology companies.

The company also provides training courses and certifications.

Background and history 
Mati Aharoni, OffSec's co-founder, started the business around 2006 with his wife Iris. OffSec LLC was formed in 2008. The company was structured as OffSec Services, LLC in 2012 in North Carolina. In September 2019 the company received its first venture capital investment, from Spectrum Equity, and CEO Ning Wang replaced Joe Steinbach, the previous CEO for four years, who ran the business from the Philippines. Jim O’Gorman, the company's chief strategy officer, also gives training and writes books. Customers include Cisco, Wells Fargo, Booz Allen Hamilton, and defense-related U.S. government agencies. The company gives training sessions at the annual Black Hat hacker conference.

In 2019, J.M. Porup of CSO online wrote "few infosec certifications have developed the prestige in recent years of the OffSec Certified Professional (OSCP)," and said it has "a reputation for being one of the most difficult," because it requires student to hack into a test network during a difficult "24-hour exam." He also summarized accusations of cheating, and OffSec's responses, concluding hiring based only on credentials was a mistake, and an applicants skills should be validated. In 2020, cybersecurity professional Matt Day of Start a Cyber Career, writing a detailed review and comparison of OSCP and CompTIA PenTest+, said OSCP was "well known in the pentesting community, and therefore well known by the managers that hire them."

Projects 
In addition to their training and security services, the company also founded open source projects, online exploit databases and security information teaching aids.

Kali Linux 
The company is known for developing Kali Linux, which is a Debian Linux based distribution modeled after BackTrack. It succeeds BackTrack Linux, and is designed for security information needs, such as penetration testing and digital forensics. Kali NetHunter is OffSec's project for the ARM architecture and Android devices. Kali Linux contains over 600 security programs. The release of the second version (2.0) received a wide coverage in the digital media OffSec provides a book, Kali Linux Revealed, and makes the first edition available for free download. Users and employees have been inspired to have careers in social engineering. In 2019, in a detailed review, Cyberpunk called OffSec's Kali Linux, " known as BackTrack," the "best penetration testing distribution."

BackTrack 
BackTrack Linux was an open source GNU General Public License Linux distribution developed by programmers from around the world with assistance, coordination, and funding from OffSec. The distribution was originally developed under the names Whoppix, IWHAX, and Auditor. It was designed to delete any trace of its usage. The distribution was widely known and used by security experts.

ExploitDB 
Exploit Database is an archive of vulnerable software and exploits that have been made public by the information security community. The database is designated to help penetration testers test small projects easily by sharing information with each other. The database also contains proof-of-concepts (POC), helping information security professionals learn new exploits variations. In Ethical Hacking and Penetration Testing Guide, Rafay Baloch said Exploit-db had over 20,000 exploits, and was available in BackTrack Linux by default. In CEH v10 Certified Ethical Hacker Study Guide, Ric Messier called exploit-db a "great resource," and stated it was available within Kali Linux by default, or could be added to other Linux distributions.

Metasploit 
Metasploit Unleashed is a charity project created by OffSec for the sake of Hackers for Charity, which was started by Johnny Long. The projects teaches Metasploit and is designed especially for people who consider starting a career in penetration testing.

Google Hacking Database 
Google Hacking Database was created by Johnny Long and is now hosted by OffSec. The project was created as a part of Hackers for Charity. The database helps security professionals determine whether a given application or website is compromised. The database uses Google search to establish whether usernames and passwords had been compromised.

See also

 OffSec Certified Professional
 Kali Linux
Kali NetHunter
 BackTrack Linux
 List of computer security certifications

References

External links 
 OffSec Official Website
 Kali Linux Official Website
 

Digital forensics software
Computer security procedures
Computer network security
Software testing
Data security
Security
Crime prevention
National security
Cryptography
Information governance